Norton Fitzwarren is a village, electoral ward, and civil parish in Somerset, England, situated  north west of Taunton in the Somerset West and Taunton district.  The village has a population of 3,046 {-2 (couple got murdered by Collin Reeves, 17th June 2022) Former soldier guilty of murdering neighbours after parking dispute | Crime | The Guardian.}

History
The village is on the southern slope of Norton Camp, a large hillfort that shows evidence of occupation from neolithic times, through the Bronze Age, to the Roman occupation of Britain.

The Church of All Saints dates from the late 13th and early 14th century. It has been designated as a Grade II* listed building.

The parish of Norton Fitzwarren was part of the Taunton Deane Hundred.

On 23 November, 2021 a double murder occurred in the village, involving a local IT teacher and coffee shop worker.

Governance
The parish council has responsibility for local issues, including setting an annual precept (local rate) to cover the council’s operating costs and producing annual accounts for public scrutiny. The parish council evaluates local planning applications and works with the local police, district council officers, and neighbourhood watch groups on matters of crime, security, and traffic. The parish council's role also includes initiating projects for the maintenance and repair of parish facilities, as well as consulting with the district council on the maintenance, repair, and improvement of highways, drainage, footpaths, public transport, and street cleaning. Conservation matters (including trees and listed buildings) and environmental issues are also the responsibility of the council.

The village falls within the non-metropolitan district of Somerset West and Taunton, which was established on 1 April 2019. It was previously in the district of Taunton Deane, which was formed on 1 April 1974 under the Local Government Act 1972, and part of Taunton Rural District before that. The district council is responsible for local planning and building control, local roads, council housing, environmental health, markets and fairs, refuse collection and recycling, cemeteries and crematoria, leisure services, parks, and tourism.

Somerset County Council is responsible for running the largest and most expensive local services such as education, social services, libraries, main roads, public transport, policing and  fire services, trading standards, waste disposal and strategic planning.

It is also part of the Taunton Deane county constituency represented in the House of Commons of the Parliament of the United Kingdom. It elects one Member of Parliament (MP) by the first past the post system of election.

Military connections

PoW Camp
It was the location of a 300-person Prisoner of War camp during World War II, initially housing Italian prisoners from the Western Desert Campaign, and later German prisoners after the Battle of Normandy. POW Camp Number 665 - 'Cross Keys Camp', Norton Fitzwarren.

Royal Marines
Just north of the village is Norton Manor Camp, home of 40 Commando, Royal Marines. For many years it was the base of Junior Leaders Battalion, Royal Army Service Corps (until 1965 when RASC was disbanded) which became Junior Leaders Regiment, Royal Corps of Transport. From the early 1960s to the late 1970s, it took boys from age 15 yrs to age 17½ years and trained them to be army transport drivers.

Industry
Norton Fitzwarren is located on the confluence of many fast flowing local water flows, and from the 1700s onwards became the base for many water-powered weaving mills, and after the riots in London, also many Silk Mills, which gave part of the area its name.

For many years Norton Fitzwarren was the site of the main factory of the Taunton Cider Company producing cider brands such as Blackthorn Cider. Production was moved to Shepton Mallet after Matthew Clark plc, the UK division of Constellation Brands, bought Taunton Cider in 1995.

Transport

Norton Fitzwarren was the site of a boat lift on the now disused section of the Grand Western Canal from 1839 to 1867.

Norton Fitzwarren is on the former Bristol and Exeter Railway mainline, which was operated and then taken over by the  GWR in 1890. Resultantly, the station had two island platforms creating four platforms. There were also extensive freight handling facilities, as the station was located west of the Fairwater Yard, a large regional freight yard located south of the mainline. During World War II, the United States Army took over Norton Manor Camp located immediately northwest of the station, and equipped it with extensive railway sidings, all connected to the station. The first major railway accident occurred on 10 November 1890, and the second on 4 November 1940, which killed 13 Royal Navy personnel who were working at the camp. In 2018 a plaque honouring the victims of both crashes was unveiled in the village.

Norton Fitzwarren station closed in 1966, the same year that the British Army supply depot closed. Taunton Cider took over the former goods yard to the north of the site, but this also closed in the early 1990s, and has been redeveloped as housing. Most of the former Minehead branch is now operated by the West Somerset Railway as a heritage railway.

See also
 Norton Camp Bronze Age hillfort
 Norton Fitzwarren rail crash (1940)
 Norton Fitzwarren rail crash (1890)

References

External links

Norton Fitzwarren Parish Council

 
Villages in Taunton Deane
Civil parishes in Somerset